Sosene Raymond Anesi (born 3 June 1981 in Apia, Samoa) is a former rugby union footballer who played as a fullback and wing and currently the head coach of CS Dinamo București.

Career
Anesi came from Samoa to New Zealand in 2000 on a rugby scholarship arranged between St Joseph's College in Apia and St John's College in Hamilton. He made his National Provincial Championship debut for Waikato in 2003. He played for the Chiefs in the Super 14 up until 2007. He made his All Blacks debut from the bench in 2005 against Fiji at Albany, but did not play any further tests. In 2010 and 2011, he played for the Waratahs in the Super Rugby competition, in 2012 played for NTT Communications Shining Arcs Japan's Top League and the NSW Shute Shield competition for the Parramatta Two Blues Rugby club. He now plays for RCM MVT Timișoara, 2012 and 2013 SuperLiga Champion from Romania.

In November 2007 Anesi was charged with assault. He was given diversion.

Sevens
He was a member of the New Zealand sevens team in 2004 and again in the team that won gold at the 2006 Commonwealth Games in Melbourne.

2007 neck injury
Anesi fractured his neck in the second round Super 14 match against the Wellington Hurricanes at Waikato Stadium on 9 February 2007. A strong tackle from Hurricanes winger Ma'a Nonu resulted in the injury which rules Anesi out for season 2007.  Immediate surgery was not required, but he needed to go through a rehabilitation period. Anesi returned in the second season of the Air New Zealand Cup.

2013 Superliga Champions
Anesi now plays for RCM MVT Timișoara and was a member of the premiership winning team of 2013. Anesi is the first ever All Black and one of the first ever Super Rugby players to play in the SuperLiga. His debut in the Superliga against Farul Constanţa was on 13 July 2013 in Stadionul de Rugby Mihai Naca|Constanța.  He was not the only Super Rugby player to debut, with Nathan Eyres-Brown the former Queensland Reds player debuting for Farul Constanţa.

References

External links
 Waratahs' profile
 
 
 

 Sosene Anesi at Timișoara Saracens website

1981 births
Living people
New Zealand sportspeople of Samoan descent
Barbarian F.C. players
Rugby union wings
Rugby union fullbacks
New Zealand international rugby union players
Commonwealth Games gold medallists for New Zealand
Rugby sevens players at the 2006 Commonwealth Games
New Zealand male rugby sevens players
New Zealand rugby union coaches
Chiefs (rugby union) players
New South Wales Waratahs players
Waikato rugby union players
Urayasu D-Rocks players
SCM Rugby Timișoara players
Expatriate rugby union players in Japan
Expatriate rugby union players in Romania
Sportspeople from Apia
New Zealand international rugby sevens players
People educated at St John's College, Hamilton
Commonwealth Games rugby sevens players of New Zealand
Commonwealth Games medallists in rugby sevens
Medallists at the 2006 Commonwealth Games
New Zealand expatriate rugby union players
New Zealand expatriate sportspeople in Australia
New Zealand expatriate sportspeople in Romania
New Zealand expatriate sportspeople in Japan
Expatriate rugby union players in Australia
Samoan rugby union players
Samoan rugby union coaches
Samoan expatriate rugby union players
Samoan expatriate sportspeople in Australia
Samoan expatriate sportspeople in Romania
Samoan expatriate sportspeople in Japan